Scandinavian electropop-folktronica duo Ask Embla, consisting of Icelandic Arnthor Birgisson (as producer and songwriter) and Norwegian Ina Wroldsen (as singer and songwriter), released its studio album, Northern Light, in 2013. It followed two singles and one music video.

Track listing

Singles

Music videos

References

Norwegian music
Icelandic art
Electronica albums
2013 albums